Ude-Hishigi-Kata-Osae-Tai-Gatame is described in
The Canon Of Judo and is demonstrated by Kyuzo Mifune
in the video,
The Essence of Judo.

See also
Judo technique

Judo technique